The Stadio comunale Carlo Castellani is a multi-purpose stadium in Empoli, Italy.  It is currently used mostly for football matches and the home of Empoli F.C. The stadium holds 16,284.

Built in 1923, the Stadio Carlo Castellani is currently the home of Empoli.

The stadium is located in the sporting district of Empoli on the viale delle Olimpiadi.

Inaugurated on September 12, 1965 the ground was dedicated to Carlo Castellani, former football player born in nearby Montelupo Fiorentino, who died prematurely after being deported to the concentration camp of Mauthausen.

It is formed by two tribune, or grandstands, and two curve with a total capacity of 16,284 spectators. The Curva Sud was recently renovated, with older structures being replaced. The Municipality of Empoli and the Banca di Cambiano have financed the renovations.
The stadium is also equipped with an athletics track for long jump and a running track.

References

Venue
Carlo Castellani
Multi-purpose stadiums in Italy
Empoli
Sports venues in Tuscany
Sports venues completed in 1965
Carlo